Flute n Oboe  (full title The Flute and the Oboe of Bud Shank and Bob Cooper) is an album by Bud Shank and Bob Cooper recorded in November 1956 for the Pacific Jazz label.

Reception

AllMusic rated the album with three stars.

Track listing
All compositions by Bob Cooper, except as indicated.
 "They Didn't Believe Me" (Jerome Kern, Herbert Reynolds) - 4:40
 "Gypsy in My Soul" (Clay Boland, Moe Jaffe) - 3:23
 "In the Blue of Evening" (Al D'Artega, Tom Adair) - 3:37
 "I Want to Be Happy" (Vincent Youmans, Irving Caesar) - 2:32
 "Tequila Time" - 4:18
 "I Can't Get Started" (Vernon Duke, Ira Gershwin) - 4:20
 "Blues for Delilah" - 7:00
 "Sunset and Wine" - 4:11
 "What'll I Do" (Irving Berlin) - 2:47

Personnel 
Bud Shank - flute
Bob Cooper - oboe, arranger, conductor
Howard Roberts - guitar
Don Prell - bass
Chuck Flores - drums
Eudice Shapiro, Ben Gill - violin (tracks 1, 3 & 5-8)
Milt Thomas - viola (tracks 1, 3 & 5-8)
Ray Kramer - cello (tracks 1, 3 & 5-8)

References 

1957 albums
Pacific Jazz Records albums
Bob Cooper (musician) albums
Bud Shank albums
Albums recorded at Capitol Studios